Lisa Anne Auerbach (born 1967 in Ann Arbor, Michigan) is an American textile artist, Zine writer, photographer, best known for her knitting works with humorous political commentary.

Education

MFA, Art Center College of Design, Pasadena, California, 1994
BFA, Rochester Institute of Technology, Rochester, New York, 1990

Biography
Born in 1967 in Ann Arbor, Michigan Auerbach currently resides in Los Angeles.

Career
Auerbach has been making knitted pieces since completing her undergraduate degree at the Art Center of Design in 1994. Photography was the discipline she studied for her MFA, however, due to lack of access to a darkroom, she used knitting as a cost-effective way to make art.

Work
Knit works, zines, newsletters and a 5-foot-tall magazine titled American Megazine are all part of her body of work. Her Knitting patterns are often created digitally and created with a knitting machine.
"While Auerbach's slogans and signs are politically blunt, her humor infuses the work with subtlety, goofiness, mockery, and self-depreciation—sometimes all at once"

Major exhibitions
2019 "Libraries," Gavlak Gallery, Los Angeles, CA
2019 "Psychic Art Advisor,"  Frieze Los Angeles, Los Angeles, CA
2016 "Wasteland," Mona Bismarck Center and Gallerie Thaddaeus Ropac, Paris, France
2015 "Parasophia, Kyoto International Festival of Culture," Kyoto, Japan
2014 "Abstract America Today," Saatchi Collection, London, U.K.
2014 Whitney Biennial, Whitney Museum of American Art, New York, NY
2014 "Spells," Gavlak Gallery, Los Angeles, CA
2013 C.O.L.A. Individual Artist Fellowship Exhibition, Los Angeles Municipal Art Gallery, Los Angeles, CA
2012 "Chicken Strikken" Malmö Konsthall, Malmö, Sweden
2009 "Take This Knitting Machine and Shove It," Nottingham Contemporary, Nottingham, UK
2006 "Right On, Weatherman," CPK Kunsthal, Copenhagen, Denmark

Projects and Works
Lisa Anne Auerbach's Body Count Mittens depict a gun with a date and a number that is the accumulative number of American soldiers killed in Iraq. There is a different date and count on each individual mitten for the day knitting started on each. The instructions and the pattern for the mittens, along with a website for checking the daily American casualties, is listed publicly on a knitter's forum, allowing the public to make their own pair.

Published works 

 Lisa Anne Auerbach, Ann Arbor, MI : University of Michigan Museum of Art, 2010

References

American women artists
American textile artists
People from Ann Arbor, Michigan
1967 births
Living people
Women textile artists
21st-century American women
People in knitting